Amman Kovil Vaasalile is a 1996 Indian Tamil-language film, directed by Ramarajan and produced by S. Rajaram. The film stars Ramarajan, Sangita, Manivannan and Senthil.

Cast
Ramarajan
Sangita
Manivannan
Senthil
Gandhimathi
Kullamani
Santhana Bharathi in a Friendly Appearance
R. Sundarrajan in a Friendly Appearance
Rajashree in a Friendly Appearance

Soundtrack

Music : Sirpy

References

External links
 

1996 films
1990s Tamil-language films
Films directed by Ramarajan